Sadki  is a village in Nakło County, Kuyavian-Pomeranian Voivodeship, in north-central Poland. It is the seat of the gmina (administrative district) called Gmina Sadki.

The village has an approximate population of 2,000.

History
The area formed part of Poland since the establishment of the state in the 10th century. Sadki was a royal village, administratively located in the Nakło County in the Kalisz Voivodeship in the Greater Poland Province of the Kingdom of Poland. The village was annexed by Prussia in the late-18th-century Partitions of Poland, and was also part of Germany from 1871. Following World War I, Poland regained independence and control of the village.

During the German occupation of Poland (World War II), the local forest was the site of executions of 86 Poles from Sadki and other nearby villages, perpetrated by the SS and Selbstschutz in October and November 1939 as part of the Intelligenzaktion.

Sports
The local football club is GLZS Sadki. It competes in the lower leagues.

References

Villages in Nakło County
Massacres of Poles
Nazi war crimes in Poland